Sebastian Theodore Kemble Croft (born 16 December 2001) is a British actor. He began his career as a child actor on stage before making his television debut as Young Ned Stark in Game of Thrones (2016). He earned a BAFTA Children's Award nomination for his role as Atti in Horrible Histories: The Movie – Rotten Romans (2019). Croft's voice work includes the film Where Is Anne Frank (2021), "Ice", an installment of the Netflix anthology Love, Death & Robots (2021) and voice option one for the player character in the game Hogwarts Legacy. In 2022, he starred as Ben Hope in the Netflix series Heartstopper.

Early life
Croft was born on 16 December 2001. He began taking acting classes at the Abingdon-on-Thames branch of Stagecoach when he was 7 and at Michael Xavier's MX Masterclass, of which Croft is now a patron. He attended the Dragon School for preparatory school and St Edward's School, Oxford for GCSEs. He completed A Levels in English, philosophy and film.

Career

Theatre
Croft made his first West End stage appearance in 2010 in Sam Mendes' production of Oliver! (Theatre Royal Drury Lane). In 2011 he was cast as Gavroche in Les Misérables (Queen's Theatre). Croft was later hand picked by producer Cameron Mackintosh to return to Oliver! this time playing the title role in the UK touring company for eighteen months. In 2013 Croft played Tommy in the Royal Shakespeare Company production of Matilda (Cambridge Theatre).  His final musical performance as a juvenile was in the title role of the world premiere production of The Secret Diary of Adrian Mole (Leicester Curve).  Prominent musical theatre workshops include: I Can't Sing, The Secret Diary of Adrian Mole, Bumblescratch, Danny Hero and The Braille Legacy.  Prominent one night concerts and performances include: Rags: The Musical (Lyric Theatre) and A Charity Concert With Emeli Sande and Laura Wright. In June 2016 Croft appeared in the West End Live presentation of Bumblescratch in Trafalgar Square.

In 2014, Croft's vocals were featured in the  National Theatre Live's production of Coriolanus (Donmar Warehouse) with Tom Hiddleston. Croft workshopped the play Emil and The Detectives (National Theatre) in the title role of Emil Tischbein. In 2016 Croft was cast in the role of Prince Arthur in Sir Trevor Nunn's production of Shakespeare's King John (Rose Theatre) for which Croft received high praise from the national press.

Film and television
In 2016 Croft appeared in the ITV and Fox series Houdini and Doyle and the Sky Atlantic and Showtime series Penny Dreadful. Croft rose to prominence portraying the role of a young Eddard Stark (portrayed by Sean Bean as an adult and Robert Aramayo as a young adult) in the sixth season of the HBO series Game of Thrones.

Croft made his feature film debut in 2017 as a Young David Logan in The Hippopotamus. He appeared in the 2019 films Music, War and Love and Horrible Histories: The Movie – Rotten Romans as Young Robert Pulaski and Atti respectively, the latter of which earned him a BAFTA Children's Award nomination in the Young Performer category.

Croft voiced Peter van Daan in the animated fantasy film Where Is Anne Frank, which premiered at the 2021 Cannes Film Festival. He lent his voice to Volume II of the Netflix animated anthology Love, Death & Robots in the Creative Arts Emmy Award-winning episode "Ice". Croft and Ty Tennant were cast as the Dead Boy Detectives Charles Rowland and Edwin Paine respectively in season 3 of the DC Universe series Doom Patrol.

In April 2021, it was announced Croft would play Ben Hope in the 2022 Netflix series Heartstopper, an adaptation of the webcomic and graphic novel of the same name by Alice Oseman. Later that year, he was part of the cast of the horror-fantasy film Dampyr released in Italy on 28 October 2022. Croft has an upcoming role in the young adult romantic comedy How to Date Billy Walsh for Amazon Prime.

Personal life
Croft has dyslexia. For the LGBT Pride Month in 2022, Croft tweeted that he "designed a t-shirt with two gay dinosaurs kissing, reminding everyone that Queer has always been here". All of the money from these sales was to go to Choose Love and Rainbow Railroad – two charities helping LGBT refugees – according to Croft.

Filmography

Film

Television

Music videos

Video games

Awards and nominations

References

External links

 
 
 

2001 births
21st-century English male actors
Actors with dyslexia
English male child actors
English male film actors
English male musical theatre actors
English male stage actors
English male television actors
English LGBT rights activists
Living people
People educated at St Edward's School, Oxford
People educated at The Dragon School
Place of birth missing (living people)